The 2015–16 Premier League (known as the Barclays Premier League for sponsorship reasons) was the 24th season of the Premier League, the top English professional league for association football clubs, since its establishment in 1992, and the 117th season of top-flight English football overall. The season began on 8 August 2015, and was scheduled to conclude on 15 May 2016. However, the match between Manchester United and Bournemouth on the final day was postponed to 17 May 2016 due to a suspicious package found at Old Trafford.

Chelsea began the season as defending champions of the 2014–15 season. Bournemouth, Watford and Norwich City entered as the three promoted teams from the 2014–15 Football League Championship.

Leicester City, managed by Italian Claudio Ranieri, were crowned champions for the first time in their 132-year history, with 2 games to spare, after Tottenham failed to beat Chelsea at Stamford Bridge on 2 May 2016, becoming the 24th club to become English football champions, and the sixth club to win the Premier League. Many commentators consider this to be one of the greatest sporting shocks in history, especially given that Leicester spent a great deal of the previous season at the bottom of the table before rallying towards the season's end to finish 14th. At the beginning of the season, bookmakers had given Leicester City odds of 5000/1 against them winning the league.

Leicester striker Jamie Vardy's goal against Manchester United on 28 November 2015 meant he had scored in 11 consecutive matches, surpassing Ruud van Nistelrooy's Premier League record of 10 straight games with a goal, which he set in 2003.

Aston Villa, one of seven teams who had played in the Premier League since its inaugural season, were relegated from the top flight in England for the first time since 1987.

Leicester celebrated their title win with renditions of "Nessun dorma" and "Con te partirò" by Andrea Bocelli, who sang for the Leicester fans on the pitch of the King Power Stadium in May.

Summary 
Leicester City were the surprise of the season. Following their late escape from relegation in the previous season many pundits had predicted that they would be relegated and bookmakers gave 5,000–1 odds on them winning the title. After the dismissal of manager Nigel Pearson, they began the new season with Italian Claudio Ranieri in charge. Pearson had been known for his short temper with the press, while Ranieri has a reputation for good humour. The appointment was met with scepticism by pundits, including Leicester fan and former player Gary Lineker, as Ranieri had recently been sacked from his previous post as manager of the Greece national team after suffering a humiliating defeat to the Faroe Islands in his last game in charge.

Despite winning their opening game against Sunderland and topping the table, they dropped back following a 5–2 home defeat to Arsenal in September. However, aided by Jamie Vardy's record feat of scoring in eleven consecutive Premier League games, they then remained unbeaten – and returned to the top of the table – until 26 December, when a 1–0 defeat to Liverpool dropped them to second place. They returned to the top after a 1–1 draw with Aston Villa on 16 January, and remained there for the rest of the season. Following a 2–2 draw between Chelsea and Tottenham Hotspur at Stamford Bridge on 2 May 2016, and having two more games to play, Leicester City were confirmed champions, their first title in the top flight of English football, eclipsing the runners-up spot they reached in 1929.

Defending champions Chelsea sacked manager José Mourinho in December while in 16th place and eventually failed to qualify for European football for the first time in two decades. Eden Hazard, the previous season's PFA Players' Player of the Year, did not score a league goal until late April. They eventually finished 10th, breaking the record for lowest finish for a Premier League title holder - 7th - held jointly by Blackburn Rovers in 1995–96 and Manchester United in 2013–14. This record only stood for one year, as Leicester City finished 12th the following season.

Arsenal, looking for their first title since 2004 and following a poor start, improved and in early January took the top spot from Leicester. However, a poor run of results, including draws with Liverpool, Stoke City and Southampton, and a loss to Chelsea saw them drop to fourth by mid-February. They remained in contention, but draws with West Ham United, Sunderland and Crystal Palace in April saw their title hopes vanish.

Meanwhile, Arsenal's London rivals Tottenham Hotspur won six matches in a row, and when Arsenal lost to Manchester United at the end of February, Tottenham leapfrogged them into second place, where they remained until the final weekend of the season. Draws with West Bromwich Albion and Chelsea prevented them from winning their first league title since 1961. The game in which Tottenham's title challenge ended was their 2–2 draw at Chelsea on 2 May, with many altercations between players and benches on and off the field, especially after Eden Hazard scored the equalizing and final goal. Mark Clattenburg, who refereed the game, subsequently stated that he could have "sent three players off from Tottenham" but chose instead to allow them to play on, giving the team a total of nine yellow cards (a league record), so as to allow them to "self destruct" and have no one else to blame but themselves.

After a 2–1 home loss to Southampton and a 5–1 defeat away to Newcastle United in their final two matches, Tottenham ended the season in third place, one point behind Arsenal.

West Ham United, in their final season at the Boleyn Ground after 112 years, achieved 62 points, a club record for a Premier League campaign. It was also the first Premier League season where they had finished with a positive goal difference (+14) and West Ham's eight defeats was also a club record for the fewest losses suffered in a Premier League season. 

Aston Villa, a presence in the Premier League since the league's foundation in 1992 and present in the top division since the 1988–89 season, were the first team to be mathematically relegated, after a 1–0 loss at Manchester United on 16 April. On 11 May, Sunderland won 3–0 against Everton, a result which relegated both Newcastle United and Norwich City with one game remaining.

All of the final fixtures of the season were scheduled for 15 May and were to kick off at the same time. However, Manchester United's home game against Bournemouth was postponed to two days later after Old Trafford was evacuated because of the discovery of a suspicious device, which was destroyed in a controlled explosion. It was confirmed to be an accidental leftover from a training exercise.

Reactions
The unlikely nature of Leicester's title led to a flood of coverage from across the globe. Prime Minister David Cameron tweeted his congratulations, saying it was "An extraordinary, thoroughly deserved, Premier League title." Congratulations were also sent by the Italian Prime Minister Matteo Renzi, who praised his compatriot Ranieri.

Premier League chief executive Richard Scudamore described it as "biggest story we've ever had" in English football. Former Leicester manager Martin O'Neill described it as the "greatest achievement of this century". Gary Lineker, the former Leicester striker who led a consortium that saved the club from administration in 2002, had said he would host the BBC football show Match of the Day in his underwear if Leicester won the title. After they won the title, he did indeed present the show clad only in boxer shorts. He said: "There were no odds that I would have taken at the start of the season. No odds. You could have given me 10 million to one and I'd have said 'Nah, it's a waste of a quid'". José Mourinho, manager of 2015 champions Chelsea and Ranieri's replacement at the same team eleven years earlier, sent his congratulations, saying: "I lost my title to Claudio Ranieri and it is with incredible emotion that I live this magic moment in his career."
Ranieri said after winning his first title at the age of 64 that he wouldn't have appreciated it as a young man: "Now I am an old man I can feel it much better."	

The long odds bookmakers had given Leicester at the start of the season led to them incurring losses of up to £25 million, with one punter winning over £100,000, having wagered £20 at the original 5,000–1 odds; the largest payout was £200,000 to an anonymous bettor who wagered £100 on the team in October when the odds were improved to 2,000–1.

Superstitious claims of phenomena helping Leicester win the league include the club's Thai owners engaging Buddhist monks to bless the players, and the reburial of King Richard III in the city's cathedral in March 2015.

Notes 
1. This is a Premier League record. The all time first tier of English football record stands at 12, by Jimmy Dunne in 1932.
2. A promise which he later kept. The reference includes a brief clip from the beginning of the programme.

Teams
Twenty teams competed in the league – the top seventeen teams from the previous season and the three teams promoted from the Championship. The promoted teams were Bournemouth (playing in the top flight for the first time ever), Watford (returning to the top flight after eight years) and Norwich City (returning after a season's absence). They replaced Hull City (ending their two-year spell in the top flight), Burnley and Queens Park Rangers (both teams relegated after a season's presence).

Stadiums and locations

Note: Table lists in alphabetical order.

Personnel and kits

 Additionally, referee kits are made by Nike, sponsored by EA Sports, and Nike has a new match ball, the Ordem Premier League.

Managerial changes

League table

Results

Season statistics

Scoring

Top scorers

Hat-tricks

Notes
4 Player scored 4 goals5 Player scored 5 goals(H) – Home team(A) – Away team

Clean sheets

Discipline

Player
Most yellow cards: 11
 Jack Colback (Newcastle United)
Most red cards: 3
 Victor Wanyama (Southampton)

Club
Most yellow cards: 74
Aston Villa
Most red cards: 6
Southampton

Awards

Monthly awards

Annual awards

References

External links

Official website

 
Premier League seasons
Eng
1